is a Japanese television drama series that was broadcast on TBS series from 2007. The series is based on a novel by Takahisa Igarashi in 2006. The South Korean comedy film Daddy You, Daughter Me directed by Kim Hyeong-hyeop in 2017 was based on this series.

Plot
Kyōichirō Kawahara (Hiroshi Tachi) a salaryman working as the Deputy Director of Public Relations Department, for a leading cosmetic company. He currently leads a group called "Rainbow Dream" a project that targets young consumer. On the other hand, Kawahara Koume the daughter of Kyōichirō is on bad term with him, she is a year two student from Sakura Taipei High School and is really good at texting. One day on a family trip Kyōichirō and Koume are on a train and an accident happens, the two switch souls for seven days. What will the father-daughter do when they switch souls, experiencing as a middle-aged salaryman and a young high school teenager?

Cast

Main characters
Kyōichirō Kawahara played by Hiroshi Tachi
 Kyōichirō a salaryman working as the Deputy Director of Public Relations Department, for a leading cosmetic company. He currently leads a group called "Rainbow Dream" a project that targets young consumer.
Kawahara Koume played by Yui Aragaki
 Koume the daughter of Kyōichirō is on bad term with him, she is a year two student from Sakura Taipei High School and is really good a texting.

Kawahara Family
Reiko Kawahara played by Yumi Asō
 Reiko is Kyōichirō wife and Koume mother.
Hisoka Kunieda played by Sumie Sasaki 
 Reiko's mother and Koume's grandmother lives in the mountains of Chiba, she has some secrets that not many people know.
Toshiko Kunieda played by Tatsuki Kasu
 Reiko's Sister and Koume's Aunt

Bisei Cosmetic
Kosuke Nakajima played by Norito Yashima
 Kyōichirō superior
Kazuko Nishino played by Mayumi Sada
 A member of the new product development project team, she likes Kyōichirō.
Koichi Maeda played by Kenji Kaneko
A member of the new product development project team. He used to be in the Sales Department.
Wataru Mifune played by Yūji Miyashita 
A member of the new product development project team, and likes gossips.
Kanako Shīna played by Imai Rika
A member of the new product development project team, she came into the group because she is the daughter of some major departments president.
Hisako Itsaki played by Chie Īnuma
  A member of the new product development project team, originally from the accounting department.
Takeshi Watanabe played by Tōru Emori
4th generation Chairman of Bisei cosmetics. He does not easily move with talks during the conference since he is mostly sleeping.

Sakura Taipei High School

Oosugi Kenta (Ken) played by Shigeaki Kato
He's in third year of high school and is in the football club. He has romantic feelings for Koume and have gone through date many times.
Ritsuko Nakayama  played by Ayaka Morita 
Koume's classmate, childhood, and best friend.
Hirata Saori played by Natsuko Oki
Koume's friend.
Mr. Morozumi 
Koume's Teacher.

Episodes

References

Japanese drama television series
2007 in Japanese television
2007 Japanese television series debuts
2007 Japanese television series endings